Beverly Uueziua (born 26 May 1999) is a Namibian footballer who plays as a midfielder for the Namibia women's national team.

International career
Uueziua capped for Namibia at senior level during the 2019 COSAFA Women's Championship.

International goals
Scores and results list Namibia's goal tally first

References

1999 births
Living people
Namibian women's footballers
Namibia women's international footballers
Footballers at the 2014 Summer Youth Olympics
Women's association football midfielders